The 7mm Winchester Short Magnum (also known as the 7mm WSM) is a centrefire cartridge developed in partnership with Browning Arms Company and Winchester ammunition, making its debut and introduced to the shooting public in 2001.  It is a member of the Winchester Short Magnum family of cartridges.

Specifications
The 7mm WSM is similar to the .300 WSM with the case necked down to handle .284" bullets. However, the distance from the case head to the datum line on the shoulder is longer for the 7WSM, preventing accidental chambering or firing of the .284" 7mm bullet in .270 WSM's .277" bore.

Performance
The 7mm WSM cartridge achieves its useful purpose as an excellent cartridge for larger mule deer, sheep, black bear and elk.

Winchester claims a muzzle velocity (MV) of 3,225 ft/s with a 140 grain bullet for their 7mm WSM cartridge; the claimed muzzle energy (ME) is 3,233 ft. lbs. With a 160 grain bullet the Winchester figures are 2990 ft/s and 3176 ft. lbs. at the muzzle. The lighter, shorter 7mm bullets are preferred in these short case magnums.

Popularity
The 7mm WSM has failed to gain the same popularity as the other cartridges in the WSM family. Some people erroneously believe the short case necks make the 7mm WSM poorly suited to heavier bullets, limiting the cartridge's usefulness on larger game. It is no different in this respect than the popular 300 Winchester Magnum.  

Cost is another factor limiting popularity. Ammunition prices are higher than those of the 7mm Remington Magnum and the .280 Remington, both of which have similar performance to the 7mm WSM, with the 280 Rem having slightly less muzzle energy and the 7mm Rem Mag being roughly equal.

See also
 Table of handgun and rifle cartridges

References

 7mm Cartridge Guide, 7mm WSM section

Pistol and rifle cartridges
Winchester Short Magnum rifle cartridges